Margaret Fleming (born 1980) was a Scottish woman who was murdered by her nominated carers Edward Cairney and Avril Jones in Inverkip, Inverclyde, Scotland.

Background

Fleming, who had learning difficulties, was killed by the couple between December 1999 and January 2000, with the murder being concealed and Jones continuing to claim her benefits. This continued until 2016 when it was discovered by authorities that Fleming was missing. Despite a painstaking search of their dilapidated property and its junk-filled garden, no trace of Fleming's body has ever been found.

Investigation
In 2019 Cairney and Jones were convicted of Margaret Fleming's murder and given life sentences. 

The police investigation and subsequent murder trial were the subject of the BBC two-part documentary Murder Trial: The Disappearance of Margaret Fleming, broadcast in January 2020.

"Seacroft"
In 2017 the property was sold. In January 2020, planning permission was given to build two new houses on the site, with the house being demolished in early March the same year.

See also
List of solved missing person cases

References

2000 in Scotland
2000s missing person cases
2000 murders in the United Kingdom
Female murder victims
Missing person cases in Scotland
Murder convictions without a body
People murdered in Scotland